Carl Theodore Holling (July 9, 1896 – July 18, 1962) was a pitcher in Major League Baseball who played for the Detroit Tigers from -. Listed at 6'1", 172 lb., Holling batted and threw right-handed. He was born in Dixon, California.

In a two-season career, Holling posted a 4–8 record with 40 strikeouts and a 5.02 earned run average in 40 appearances, including 12 starts, four complete games, four saves, and 145 innings pitched.

Holling died in Santa Rosa, California aged 66.

References

External links

1896 births
1962 deaths
Major League Baseball pitchers
Detroit Tigers players
Baseball players from California
People from Dixon, California